George Eden, 1st Earl of Auckland was a British politician.

George Eden may also refer to:
George Morton Eden (1806–1862), British Army officer
George Rodney Eden (1853–1918), British Anglican bishop; Bishop of Dover and of Wakefield
George Eden (died 1559), MP for Knaresborough
George Eden (India) (–2003), former Ernakulam MP, father of Hibi Eden